Ashina Funian (r. 680–681) was a Göktürk leader and member of the Ashina tribe who was the leader of one of the Göktürkish revolts that tried to restore the Eastern Turkic Khaganate in the 7th century and break from Tang domination. His rebellion was unsuccessful and he was executed by the Tang authorities in 681.

Background 
Towards the end of the sixth century, the Turkic Khaganate, which had recently succeeded the Rouran Khaganate as the hegemonic power of the Mongolian Plateau was involved in civil war and by 603 it had separated in two independent states: The Eastern Turkic Khaganate and the Western Turkic Khaganate. This state of affairs would be short lived, with the Eastern Khaganate being conquered by the Chinese Tang dynasty in 630, and the Western Khaganate suffering the same fate in 657. After their conquest by Tang, the Eastern Turks were forced to accept a protectorate status on China's outskirts. They were confined to live inside the Ordos Loop and in 639, after an Ashina assassination attempt on Emperor Taizong of Tang, they were forced to live between the Yellow River and Gobi, as a buffer state between China and the Xueyantuo.

A first rebellion attempt was made by Chebi Khan, who tried to reestablish the Khaganate beginning in 646 before being captured by Tang general Gao Kan in 650. A second attempt took place between 679 and 680, when Ashina Nishufu, a descendant of the leading Ashina tribe, led a series of successful campaigns against Tang, now ruled by Empress Wu, before being defeated by a large Chinese army under the command of general Pei Xingjian. Nishufu was later killed by his own men.

Rebellion 
Following Nishufu's death, Ashina Funian, another scion of the royal clan, was made qaghan and the Eastern Turks once again rebelled against the Tang occupation.

The early stages of the rebellion brought about some victories for Funian. In one of the first battles, Funian defeated the Tang general Cao Huaishun and showed mercy towards him and his army, granting them free passage in exchange for valuables, with the two leaders even sacrificing an ox in order to seal a peace pact. These impromptu diplomatic efforts on behalf of Cao were not well received by the Tang authorities, who refused to honour his agreement and punished Cao with exile.

In 681, the Eastern Turks were once again defeated by Pei Xiangjin, who convinced the defeated leader to surrender under, with the promise that he will not suffer consequences for his rebellion. Once in captivity, however, Funian became the center of court intrigue, with the powerful Chief Minister Pei Yan, a political adversary of Pei Xianjing, calling for the execution of Funian and other leaders of the Turkic rebellion.

On 5 December 681, Ashina Funian and 53 other Göktürks were publicly executed in Chang'an. This execution, as well as the fact that it came about as a result of court politics, further fueled anti-Chinese sentiments among Eastern Turks.

Aftermath 
Funian's death proved to be only a temporary respite for the rebelling Göktürk who, in 682, elected the chieftain Ashina Qutlugh as their next qaghan, under the name Ilterish Qaghan. Ilterish gathered Funian's troops and united the tribes and managed to defeat Tang China and gain independence, founding the Second Turkic Khaganate.

References

Göktürk khagans